Concepción Buenavista  is a town and municipality in Oaxaca in southwestern Mexico. It covers an area of  357.23 km2 and is part of the Coixtlahuaca district in the Mixteca Region. In 2005 it had a population of 828.

References

Municipalities of Oaxaca